Gesina ter Borch (Deventer 15 November 1631 –  Zwolle 16 April 1690) was a Dutch Golden Age watercolorist and draftswoman, whose work mostly consists of watercolor paintings in albums. Most of her work captured her observations of family life, current events, and fashionable people. In addition to the visual arts, Gesina wrote love poetry.

Biography
Gesina ter Borch was born on 15 November 1631 in Deventer in the Dutch Republic. She was the first child of the third marriage of Gerard ter Borch the Elder, who taught her to draw and paint. Her half-brother Gerard ter Borch II enjoyed artistic success and corresponded with Gesina frequently. After the loss of her younger brother, Moses, to the Second English War, Gesina's work conveyed her deep sadness.
She lived her whole life on the Sassenstraat in Zwolle, where she died on 16 April 1690. Gesina never married during her lifetime. In 1660, she became friends with Henrik Jordis, who was a merchant from Amsterdam and an amateur poet. This resulted in courtship.

Career 
Gesina ter Borch was very successful during her artistic career. She also aided her older half-brother Gerard in a few of his pieces. Gesina was a model for many of the ladies that are depicted in Gerard's works Ladies in Satin. Gerard considered Gesina his favorite model for these works. She also furthered her art career on the side, while modeling for her brother. Gesina became a successful watercolorist. During her lifetime, she collected love poetry, and she made illustrations to coincide with it as well. Some albums of her work even included pieces dedicated to songs about love.

Works 
While only one painting by Gesina ter Borch is known, three watercolor albums survive, as well as 59 loose sheets of drawings. Her work was not widely known during her lifetime, because she was an amateur rather than a professional artist. Between ages 14 and 15, Gesina began her first album, Materi-boeck. Between 1652 and 1660, she produced a second album with 116 sheets containing songs, poems, and illustrations. In March of 2021 Borch's work was added to the "Gallery of Honor" at the Rijksmuseum. Borch, Judith Leyster, and Rachel Ruysch are the first women to be included in the gallery.

References

External links 

 Gesina ter Borch on Artnet

1633 births
1690 deaths
Dutch Golden Age painters
People from Zwolle
Dutch women painters
17th-century women artists
Sibling artists